Maratus griseus, the white-banded house jumping spider, is a species of jumping spider in the family Salticidae. It is found in Australia and New Zealand.

References

Further reading

 

Salticidae
Spiders of Australia
Spiders of New Zealand
Spiders described in 1882